Simon Gordon Jared Russell, 3rd Baron Russell of Liverpool (born 30 August 1952), is a British crossbench peer.

The paternal grandson of Edward Russell, 2nd Baron Russell of Liverpool, he was educated at Charterhouse School, Trinity College, Cambridge, and INSEAD. His maternal grandfather was the Conservative MP Sir Arthur Howard. Russell is also the great-grandson of former British Prime Minister Stanley Baldwin.

Having lost his seat in the House of Lords under the House of Lords Act 1999, he returned as an elected hereditary peer at a by-election in December 2014. He sits as a crossbencher.

References

1952 births
Living people
People educated at Charterhouse School
Alumni of Trinity College, Cambridge
INSEAD alumni
Barons in the Peerage of the United Kingdom
Crossbench hereditary peers

Russell of Liverpool
Russell of Liverpool